Montreux Suisse is a live album by the improvisational collective Air featuring Henry Threadgill, Steve McCall and Fred Hopkins recorded at the Montreux Jazz Festival, in Switzerland in 1978. It has never been reissued on Compact Disc by itself, but it was included in the 8CD Complete Novus and Columbia Recordings of Henry Threadgill and Air set on Mosaic Records.

Reception
The Allmusic review by Scott Yanow awarded the album 3 stars, stating, "Air's music frequently takes several listens to appreciate, and that is true of this passionate yet thoughtful outing".

Track listing
All compositions by Henry Threadgill except as indicated
 "Let's All Go Down to the Footwash" - 11:12
 "Abra" - 12:50
 "Suisse Air" (Henry Threadgill, Fred Hopkins, Steve McCall) - 15:07 
Recorded at the Montreux Jazz Festival on July 22, 1978

Personnel
Henry Threadgill - alto saxophone, tenor saxophone, baritone saxophone, hubkaphone
Fred Hopkins - bass
Steve McCall - drums, percussion

References

Air (free jazz trio) live albums
1977 live albums
Albums produced by Michael Cuscuna
Novus Records live albums
Albums recorded at the Montreux Jazz Festival